Cretazeus rinaldii is an extinct genus of ray-finned fish from the Campanian age of Nardò, Italy. It is the oldest known zeiform fish, and cannot yet be placed in any family.

References

Zeiformes
Cretaceous bony fish
Late Cretaceous fish
Cretaceous fish of Europe
Prehistoric ray-finned fish genera
Fossil taxa described in 2000